Song Byeong-jun (Korean:송병준, hanja:宋秉畯, August 20, 1857 – February 1, 1925) was a Korean Joseon dynasty politician, noted for his role in the Japan–Korea Treaty of 1910. His clan was the Eunjin Song clan. His literary name was Jeam (제암;濟庵).

Biography
Song was born in Changjin County of Hamgyong Province in what is now South Hamgyong Province, North Korea. He was an eighth-generation descendant of the famous Neo-confucian philosopher Song Si-yeol, albeit from an illegitimate line as his mother was a Kisaeng. Despite the handicap of his birth, he passed the Korean Imperial Examination in 1871 and obtained a post at the Board of Examination in 1873. Following the failure of the Gapsin Coup of 1884, he went to Japan intending to assassinate Enlightenment Party leader Kim Ok-gyun, but was instead won over to the pro-reform movement by Kim and his followers.

Song returned to Korea in 1904 as an interpreter for the Imperial Japanese Army during the Russo-Japanese War. He was one of the founders of the Iljinhoe, a pro-Japanese political society promoting the merger of Korea and Japan, and which was instrumental in bringing about the Japan–Korea Treaty of 1910. From 1907, he served as Minister of Agriculture, Commerce and Industry in the last cabinet of Emperor Gojong. Following the annexation of Korea, Song was awarded the Japanese kazoku peerage title of viscount (shishaku) and a seat in the House of Peers of the Diet of Japan. He later served on the Central Advisory Institute of the Government-General of Korea, and his title was subsequently raised to count (hakushaku).

Under the Special law to redeem pro-Japanese collaborators' property enacted in 2005, the property of the descendants of nine people who had collaborated when Korea was annexed by Japan was confiscated by the Korean government.

Honours 

 Order of the Taegeuk 1st Class on 25 October 1907

References

External links 

1857 births
1925 deaths
People from Changjin County
Kazoku
Korean collaborators with Imperial Japan
Korean politicians
19th-century Korean people
20th-century Korean people
Eunjin Song clan
Officials of the Korean Empire
Traitors in history
Politicians of the Korean Empire